Eucalyptus expressa, commonly known as the Wollemi stringybark, is a recently discovered Australian tree species. It has rough, fibrous stringybark on the trunk and larger branches, lance-shaped to curved adult leaves, flower buds in groups of between seven and twenty four and hemispherical to shortened spherical fruit with the valves extending well beyond the rim of the fruit.

Description
The bark is grey brown, with reddish tinges. The edges of older leaves are scalloped or irregularly toothed and the veins diverge at an angle of 30 to 40 degrees to the midrib.

This species is similar to E. eugenioides but differs in its tall habit, scalloped leaf edges and conspicuously protruding valves in the fruit.

Taxonomy and naming
Eucalyptus expressa was first formally described in 2012 by Stephen Bell and Dean Nicolle from a specimen alongside the Putty Road near Bulga and the description was published in the journal Telopea. Before its formal description, it was known as E. sp. aff. eugenioides (Bees Nest Ridge). The specific epithet (expressa) is from the Latin expressus, which means “prominent and clearly exhibited”, and refers to the long, narrow, prominent external valves of the fruit.

Distribution and habitat
The Wollemi stringybark is a tall forest tree from at least seven populations in sheltered gullies in the sandstone ranges north-west of Sydney. It occurs in and near Wollemi National Park and Yengo National Park.

Conservation status
A ROTAP rarity rating of 2KC has been proposed for this species.

See also
List of Eucalyptus species

Photos

References

Myrtales of Australia
Flora of New South Wales
Trees of Australia
expressa
Plants described in 2012